Wendell L. Willkie School, also known as the Central School, was a historic school building located at Elwood, Madison County, Indiana.  It was built between 1893 and 1895, and was originally a two-story, Romanesque Revival style stone and brick building.  A third floor was added at a later date.  Republican presidential candidate Wendell L. Willkie attended the school from about 1898 to 1910; it was named for him in 1944. Newer building burned June 22, 1988; older building razed same year.

It was listed on the National Register of Historic Places in 1975 and delisted in 1990.

References

Former National Register of Historic Places in Indiana
School buildings on the National Register of Historic Places in Indiana
Romanesque Revival architecture in Indiana
School buildings completed in 1893
Buildings and structures in Madison County, Indiana
National Register of Historic Places in Madison County, Indiana